Shannon Hills is a city in Saline County, Arkansas, United States. The population was 3,143 at the 2010 census. It is part of the Little Rock–North Little Rock–Conway Metropolitan Statistical Area.

History 
The area that would become Shannon Hills remained undeveloped until circa 1960, when housing development started. In 1977, residents voted to incorporate in part to avoid annexation into Little Rock.

Geography
Shannon Hills is located at  (34.621858, -92.400765).

Demographics

2020 census

As of the 2020 United States census, there were 4,490 people, 1,200 households, and 880 families residing in the city.

2000 census
As of the census of 2000, there were 2,005 people, 748 households, and 594 families residing in the city. The racial makeup of the city was 92.02% White, 3.94% Black or African American, 0.85% Native American, 0.75% Asian, 0.90% from other races, and 1.55% from two or more races. Hispanic or Latino of any race were 2.04% of the population.

There were 748 households, out of which 38.1% had children under the age of 18 living with them, 61.6% were married couples living together, 13.5% had a female householder with no husband present, and 20.5% were non-families. 16.0% of all households were made up of individuals, and 4.7% had someone living alone who was 65 years of age or older.  The average household size was 2.68 and the average family size was 2.98.

In the city, the population was spread out, with 27.4% under the age of 18, 9.5% from 18 to 24, 34.1% from 25 to 44, 21.7% from 45 to 64, and 7.3% who were 65 years of age or older.  The median age was 32 years.  For every 100 females, there were 95.8 males.  For every 100 females age 18 and over, there were 92.5 males.

The median income for a household in the city was $40,068, and the median income for a family was $43,021. Males had a median income of $31,184 versus $21,875 for females. The per capita income for the city was $16,292.  About 6.7% of families and 6.6% of the population were below the poverty line, including 7.6% of those under the age of 18 and 7.0% of those 65 and older.

Education
Most of Shannon Hills is in the Bryant School District, which operates Bryant High School.

A portion is in the Pulaski County Special School District, which extends into Saline County. This part is zoned to Landmark Elementary School, Fuller Middle School and Wilbur D. Mills High School.

References

Cities in Saline County, Arkansas
Cities in Arkansas
Cities in Little Rock–North Little Rock–Conway metropolitan area